Victory Mills is a historic textile mill building located at Victory in Saratoga County, New York. It features six tower structures, five for stairs and one holding a water tower. It operated as a cotton mill until 1929, when operations moved to Guntersville, Alabama. In 1937, it was purchased by the United Board and Carton Corporation, later A.L. Garber / Wheelabrator-Frye, then Clevepak Corporation / Victory Specialty Packaging Company who manufactured folding cartons.

It was listed on the National Register of Historic Places in 2009.

See also
 Saratoga Victory Mill in Alabama

References

Industrial buildings and structures on the National Register of Historic Places in New York (state)
Industrial buildings completed in 1918
Buildings and structures in Saratoga County, New York
Cotton mills in the United States
National Register of Historic Places in Saratoga County, New York